Valerie Inside Outside (Italian: Valeria dentro e fuori) is a 1972 Italian drama film written and directed by Brunello Rondi.

Cast 
 
 Barbara Bouchet: Valeria Rocchi
 Pier Paolo Capponi: David Rocchi  
 Erna Schürer: Evi 
 Umberto Raho: Dr. Vannutelli 
 Maria Mizar:  Nun 
 Rosemarie Lindt:  Psychiatrist 
 Claudio Gora: "The Baron"

References

External links

1972 films
Italian drama films
1972 drama films
1970s Italian-language films
Films directed by Brunello Rondi
1970s Italian films